Raffles House is a single-storey building built on the Fort Canning Hill, Singapore. The original building was a wood and atap structure built in 1822 that was used as a place of residence by Sir Stamford Raffles.  This building was later rebuilt as a neoclassical-styled Government House as the residence of subsequent colonial governors, but it was demolished in 1858 to make way for the construction Fort Canning. The present structure built on the same site is a brick and tile building constructed in 2003.

History

Residency House

Residency House, the original residence of Sir Stamford Raffles and his sister's family, was a wooden house with venetians and thatched attap roof, the house was the earliest Singapore's project of George Drumgoole Coleman. Coleman, who waited for Raffles to return from Bencoolen, Sumatra for four months, in the meantime designed the House in speculation for Raffles' residence use.

Raffles, upon his return from Bencoolen, Sumatra in October 1822, impressed with Coleman's design, approved the house. Construction of the house was soon begun on Singapore Hill in November 1822 and completed by January 1823. Raffles and his wife Sophie would move to the house by early January 1823.

On 21 January 1823, Raffles wrote to William Marsden about the house and its scenery.

On 23 January 1823, Raffles wrote to the Duchess of Somerset about the house and the hill.

Government House

On 2 February 1824, Raffles and his family would left Singapore for England. Raffles' house was bought over by the British Government and renamed as Government House and the hill would known as the Government Hill. At the own expense of 2nd Resident John Crawfurd, the house was further extended and redesigned in June by Coleman again with bricks and tiles in the neoclassical style for the residence of Residents and Governors of Singapore. The Government House had a clear view of the settlement around Singapore River and was featured in many paintings of the area.

In 1858, the Government House was eventually demolished and the site handed to the British military for the construction of a fort in 1859 known as the Fort Canning which was completed in 1861.  Upon its demolition, the Governor's residence was temporarily moved to a villa in Oxley Estate called the Pavilion.

Rebuilding
A modernised version of the house named Raffles House was built in brick and tile nearby the site of the former Government House was completed in 2003. It is equipped with modern facilities, and may be used as a venue for events and wedding functions.

See also
 Fort Canning Lighthouse
 Fort Canning Park
 Fort Canning Reservoir
 The Battle Box

References

Demolished buildings and structures in Singapore
Buildings and structures demolished in 1859
Places in Singapore
Protected areas of Singapore
Official residences
Government Houses of the British Empire and Commonwealth
Houses completed in 1823
1823 establishments in Singapore
1859 disestablishments in the British Empire
1859 disestablishments in the Straits Settlements
19th-century architecture in Singapore